Beyond the Dreams of Avarice is a 1920 British silent drama film directed by Thomas Bentley and starring Henry Victor, Joyce Dearsley and Alban Atwood. It was based on the 1895 novel by Walter Besant.

Cast
 Henry Victor as  Dr. Lucien Calvert
 Joyce Dearsley as  Margaret Calvert
 Alban Atwood as Sir Joseph Burnley
 Frank Stanmore as Alf Burnley
 Lionel d'Aragon as  Bill Burnley
 Adelaide Grace as Old Lucy
 Jeff Barlow as  James Calvert
 Howard Cochran as  James Calvert
 A. Harding Steerman as  Nicholson

References

External links

1920 films
British drama films
British silent feature films
1920s English-language films
Films based on British novels
Ideal Film Company films
Films set in England
British black-and-white films
1920 drama films
1920s British films
Silent drama films